Indre Østfold is a municipality in the region of Indre Østfold in Viken county . The municipality was established on January 1, 2020, by a merger of the five municipalities Askim , Eidsberg , Hobøl , Spydeberg and Trøgstad. The municipality has a total population of just under 45,000, Wich is spread out over several small towns, such as Askim, Mysen, Spydeberg, Skjønhaug and Tomter. This is quite unusual for Norwegian Municipalities.

Notable people

Public service & public thinking 
 Haakon IV of Norway (1204 in Eidsberg – 1263) King of Norway 1217 to 1263 
 Jacob Nicolai Wilse (1736–1801) a parish priest in Spydeberg and Eidsberg
 Nils Christian Frederik Hals (1758 in Eidsberg – 1838 in Trøgstad) a lieutenant colonel, commanded and surrendered Fredrikstad Fortress 
 Olai Pedersen Wiig (1802 in Trøgstad - 1887) a Norwegian politician, Mayor of Trøgstad 1844 to 1847
 Halvor Heyerdahl Rasch (1805 in Eidsberg – 1883) a Norwegian zoologist and academic
 Thea Foss (1857 in Eidsberg – 1927) founded Foss Maritime, the real-life person for Tugboat Annie 
 Nordal Wille (1858 in Hobøl – 1924) a Norwegian botanist
 Adam Hiorth (1879 in Spydeberg – 1961) a Norwegian barrister and playwright
 Olga Bjoner (1887 in Askim – 1969) a Norwegian journalist and Nazi politician
 Jørgen Adolf Lier (1906–1994) a Norwegian politician, Mayor of Askim several times
 Anton Skulberg (1921–2012) a scientist and politician, Mayor of Spydeberg 1963–1967
 Dagfinn Føllesdal (born 1932 in Askim) a Norwegian-American philosopher
 Oddbjørn Engvold (born 1938 in Askim) a Norwegian astronomer
 Erik Mollatt (born 1941) a Norwegian millionaire businessperson, lives in Hobøl

The Arts 
 Enevold Thømt (1878 in Askim – 1958) a decorative painter inspired by Norwegian folk art
 Kirsten Sørlie (1926 in Askim – 2013) a Norwegian actress and stage director 
 Vidar Sandem (born 1947 in Trøgstad) a Norwegian actor, playwright and theatre director 
 Jan Garbarek (born 1947 in Mysen) a Norwegian jazz saxophonist
 Cecilie Løveid (born 1951 in Mysen) a novelist, poet, playwright and writer of children's books
 Rune Rudberg (born 1961 in Trøgstad) a Norwegian singer of dansband music
 Lene Alexandra (born 1981 in Trøgstad) a Norwegian singer, TV personality and model 
 Jon Audun Baar (born 1986 in Tomter, Hobøl) a Norwegian jazz drummer.

Sport 
 brothers Henning Solberg (born 1973) & Petter Solberg (born 1974) former professional rallycross drivers, born in Askim and grew up in Spydeberg
 Jens Kristian Skogmo (born 1987 in Askim) a Norwegian footballer with 285 club caps
Vibeke Skofterud (born 1980 in Askim Olympic Gold medallist in cross-country skiing

References

External links

Municipalities of Viken (county)